R. J. Washington (born March 14, 1989) is a former American football player. Washington played college football at Oklahoma.

High school career 
Washington prepped at Fossil Ridge High School of Keller, a suburb of Ft. Worth, Texas, where he was coached by Hal Wasson and later Tony Baccarinni. As a sophomore in 2005, he broke the school record for quarterback sacks with 10 in his first year as a varsity starter, earning district 6-4A's sophomore of the year honors.

During his junior year, Washington recorded 87 tackles, including 18 TFLs, and 10 sacks. He received all-district and all-state honors. As senior in 2007, made 84 tackles with 11 sacks and 36 quarterback pressures, finishing his career with school records in sacks per game and per career. Washington was rated the No. 1 defensive end nationally by Rivals.com. He was named the 2008 Southwest Defensive Player of the year by SuperPrep Magazine and was elected to play in the 2008 U.S. Army All-American Bowl.

College career 
Washington had numerous offers from highly regarded schools, including Texas, Texas A&M and Nebraska. He eventually committed to the Oklahoma Sooners, because of his grandparents, who live around 20 minutes outside of Norman, Oklahoma.

References

External links 
St. Louis Rams bio
Oklahoma Sooners bio

1989 births
Living people
Sportspeople from Fort Worth, Texas
American football defensive ends
Oklahoma Sooners football players